The Cabinet of Kuwait is the chief executive body of the State of Kuwait. The 38th cabinet in the history of Kuwait was appointed. On 24 January 2021, Amir of Kuwait His Highness Sheikh Nawaf Al-Ahmad Al-Jaber Al-Sabah assigned His Highness Sheikh Sabah Al-Khaled Al-Hamad Al-Sabah as Prime Minister . The Amir has also assigned the Prime Minister to refer the cabinet line-up for their appointment. On 2 March, the Prime Minister formed the new cabinet and the Amir issued a decree on the formation of the government. On 8 November 2021, the Prime Minister submitted the government's resignation to the Amir. On 14 November 2021, the Amir accepted the resignation of the Prime Minister and his government. The government will function as care-taker until the formation of the new government.

See also
Cabinet of Kuwait
35th Cabinet of Kuwait
36th Cabinet of Kuwait
37th Cabinet of Kuwait

References

External links
Current Ministerial Formation (Council of Ministers General Secretariat)
Official English names of Kuwaiti ministers and ministries (Kuwaiti Government)

Kuwait
Government of Kuwait